Union Hill Independent School District is a public school district that serves northwestern Upshur County, Texas (USA), and a small portion of northeastern Wood County.

In 2009, the school district was rated "academically acceptable" by the Texas Education Agency.

History
The district was formed in 1927 via the consolidation of the Bettie, Forest Hill, and Olive Branch schools.  In subsequent years, several other schools merged with the Union Hill district: Brumley (1945), Simpsonville (1947), Perryville (1948), and Bethlehem (1968).  The district changed from a common school district to an independent school district in 1951.

Schools
Union Hill ISD has two campuses - Union Hill High (Grades 6-12) and Sharon A. Richardson Elementary (Grades PK-5).

References

External links
Union Hill ISD

School districts in Upshur County, Texas
School districts in Wood County, Texas